Te & Kaffi is an Icelandic coffee company and coffeehouse chain. Established in 1984 by Berglind Guðbrandsdóttir and Sigmundur Dýrfjörð, Te & Kaffi operates Iceland's biggest coffee roastery, a chain of 9 coffeehouses and a wholesale business focusing on coffee, loose-leaf te  and other related products.

References

Drink companies of Iceland
Icelandic brands
Coffeehouses and cafés
Food and drink companies established in 1984
1984 establishments in Iceland
Coffee in Europe
Agricultural organizations based in Iceland